Dean Combs (born February 23, 1952) is a former NASCAR driver. In his limited career, Combs competed in twenty-four Winston Cup Series events. Combs is best known for dominance on NASCAR's lower level Dash Series in the 1970s and 1980s. He had five championships in that series, and was the all-time wins leader in that series before it closed up in 2004.

Winston Cup

1981
Combs made his entrance into the series in 1981, driving for two races late in the season. Driving for the #77 of Irv Sanderson, Combs made his debut at North Wilkesboro. He qualified well, putting it in with an 11th-place lap. Eventually, rear end problems sidelined Combs to 28th. Combs again qualified well at Rockingham, but fell out once again due to mechanical problems to 34th.

1982
Combs upped his races to five starts in 1982, beginning with a 38th at Charlotte. Including that race, Combs only managed to finish two of his five starts. However, those two were fairly impressive. Both races came at Michigan and the result was a 17th place and a 13th place showing.

1983
Combs continued on his five-race pace in 1983, continuing to drive Sanderson's cars. He still struggled to finish races, falling out of two of the events. Yet, once again, if Combs finished he had good finishes. He was 13th at Charlotte, 20th at Michigan and at Atlanta, Combs grabbed his only top-10 with a solid eighth-place finish.

1984
Combs biggest year came in 1984, when he competed in twelve events. However, judging by the nine DNFs it was not exactly successful. The only races he did finish were an 18th at Charlotte, 19th at Daytona and 25th at Richmond. After finishing 39th in points, Combs and Sanderson finally split and Combs went back to lower level racing.

Racing career results

Moonshining
In 2009, Combs was arrested for the operation of a moonshine still in North Wilkesboro, North Carolina.

References

External links
 
 Dean Combs at The Auto Channel

Living people
1952 births
Racing drivers from North Carolina
People from North Wilkesboro, North Carolina
NASCAR drivers
ISCARS Dash Touring Series drivers
American Speed Association drivers